Promicromonospora endophytica is a Gram-positive and aerobic bacterium from the genus Promicromonospora which has been isolated from the surface of the root of the tree Eucalyptus microcarpa from the Bedford Park in Adelaide, Australia.

References

External links
Type strain of Promicromonospora endophytica at BacDive -  the Bacterial Diversity Metadatabase

Micrococcales
Bacteria described in 2012